David Schreiner (December 21, 1842 – June 17, 1919) was an American farmer, businessman, and politician from Lancaster, Wisconsin.

Background 
Born in Dexbach, Grand Duchy of Hesse, Schreiner emigrated with his parents to the United States in 1855 and settled on a farm in Grant County, Wisconsin. During the American Civil War, Schreiner served in the 25th Wisconsin Volunteer Infantry Regiment and lost an arm during a battle. Schreiner was a farmer and was in the abstract titles, fire insurance, and real estate businesses.

Public office 
Schreiner served as town clerk and town treasurer. He also served on the Lancaster common council and was president of the board of education. Schreiner served as Wisconsin Circuit Court clerk for Grant County and as justice of the peace. He was the (unsuccessful) Republican nominee for state insurance commissioner in 1890, with his candidacy being supported by some over rival Robert McCurdy because Schreiner was a German-born Lutheran, and the Republican ticket was perceived as vulnerable over the Bennett Law.

In 1910, Schreiner was elected to the 2nd Grant County Wisconsin State Assembly district, with 1,910 votes to 958 for Democrat Michael McSpaden, 60 for Prohibitionist Frank Horsfall, and 58 for Social Democrat J. A. DeWitt. (Republican incumbent Henry E. Roethe was not a candidate). He was assigned to the standing committees on printing (which he chaired) and on charitable and penal institutions; and to the legislative visiting committee. Schreiner declined to be a candidate in 1912, and Roethe  was returned to his old position.

Last years 
Schreiner died June 17, 1919 at his house in Lancaster after a long illness.

Notes

1842 births
1919 deaths
People from Lancaster, Wisconsin
People of Wisconsin in the American Civil War
Businesspeople from Wisconsin
Farmers from Wisconsin
County officials in Wisconsin
Wisconsin city council members
School board members in Wisconsin
19th-century American politicians
American justices of the peace
People from the Grand Duchy of Hesse
Hessian emigrants to the United States
20th-century American politicians
Republican Party members of the Wisconsin State Assembly